Landen River Lewis (born February 26, 2006) is an American professional stock car racing driver. He competes part-time in the ARCA Menards Series West, driving the No. 17 Chevrolet SS for McGowan Motorsports.

Racing career

Early career

Go-Karts
Lewis started his career in Go-Karts at the age of 4 and from 2010-2018 he picked up 150 wins, a Maxx Nationals win, 4 Maxx Jr Daddy championships as well as 4 Maxx Daddy championships.

Dirt Modifieds
In 2018 he started racing Dirt Modifieds picking up 6 wins, 8 poles, 15 top 5’s, and 26 top 10’s and the Most Popular Driver Award for the Mid-East Dirt Modified Series.

Legend Cars
In 2019 he joined Joe Ryan Cars in Legend Cars and won the Winter Nationals in only his 2nd ever start. He would remain with the team to present day picking up 15 wins in 2020 along with a Dirt Nationals championship, picking up the Dirt Nationals, Asphalt Nationals, Winter Nationals, Road Course World Finals championships as well as the North Carolina State Championship in 2021, and in 2022 picking up the Road Course National Championship and the Summer Shootout, Road Course World Finals, and Winter Nationals titles for the Pro Division.

ARCA Menards Series

2021
Lewis made his ARCA Menards Series debut in 2021 running three races. He debuted in the Allen Crowe 100 at the Illinois State Fairgrounds Racetrack, finishing 7th. In his second career start, in the Southern Illinois 100 at the DuQuoin State Fairgrounds Racetrack, Lewis won the pole. He dominated the race, leading all 104 laps en route to his first career victory. He ran one more race, the Sioux Chief PowerPEX 200 at Salem Speedway, finishing 13th.

ARCA Menards Series West

2022
Lewis made his ARCA Menards Series West debut in 2022 in the Salute to the Oil Industry NAPA Auto Parts 150 at Kern County Raceway Park. Lewis took the lead late in the race and collected his first career ARCA Menards Series West victory in his first ever start.

Motorsports career results

ARCA Menards Series

ARCA Menards Series West

References

External links
 

2006 births
Living people
ARCA Menards Series drivers
NASCAR drivers
Racing drivers from North Carolina
People from Brunswick County, North Carolina